The Sounds is a Canadian-New Zealand coproduced television mystery drama series, premiering on Acorn TV and CBC Television in 2020. The series stars Matt Whelan and Rachelle Lefevre as Tom and Maggie Cabbott, a Canadian couple who move to the Pelorus Sound / Te Hoiere region of New Zealand to escape family drama, only for Tom to go missing. The series was created by New Zealand writer Sarah-Kate Lynch, and directed by Peter Stebbings. It is a coproduction of South Pacific Pictures and Shaftesbury Films.

The series premiered in September 2020 on Acorn TV and Neon, and on October 5, 2020 on CBC Television.

Cast
 Matt Whelan as Tom Cabbott
 Rachelle Lefevre as Maggie Cabbott
 Matt Nable as Jack McGregor
 Emily Piggford as Esther Ishikawa
 Peter Elliott as Stuart McGregor
 Anna-Maree Thomas as Zoe McGregor
 Vanessa Rare as Pania Cottle

Episodes

Production 
The Sounds was filmed in early 2020 on location in the coastal settlements of Huia and Cornwallis in the Waitākere Ranges, Auckland and at Whangaroa Harbour in Northland, New Zealand. It was a co-production of South Pacific Pictures and Shaftesbury Films.

References

External links
 
 
 

2020 Canadian television series debuts
2020 New Zealand television series debuts
2020s Canadian drama television series
CBC Television original programming
Television series by South Pacific Pictures
Television series by Shaftesbury Films
Television shows set in New Zealand
Marlborough Sounds
Television series by All3Media